Shiggy may refer to:

 Shiggy Konno (金野 滋 Konno Shigeru), Japanese rugby footballer
 Tetsuro Shigematsu, Canadian comedian
 Shiggi, a village of the Umarzai (Muhammadzai)
 "Shiggy", a song by Stephen Malkmus & the Jicks from their 2018 album Sparkle Hard